Richard Deacon may refer to:

Donald McCormick (1911–1998), British writer who also used the pseudonym Richard Deacon
Richard Deacon (actor) (1921–1984), American actor
Richard Deacon (sculptor) (born 1949), British sculptor
Dickie Deacon (1911–1986), Scottish footballer
 Richard Deacon, a Marvel Comics character also known as The Fly